Macedonia Football Clubs Association ( Énosi Podosferikón Somatíon Makedonías or Ε.Π.Σ.Μ.) is an association responsible for administering football in the Prefecture of Thessaloniki. It was formed in 1924 as Football Union of Macedonia and Thrace ( Podosferikí Énosi Makedonías Thrákis) and it administrated football in the regions of West Macedonia, Central Macedonia and East Macedonia and Thrace. Since 1935 its area of responsibility was restricted within the borders of the Prefecture of Thessaloniki. Founding members of the union were Aris, Iraklis and Megas Alexandros.

Current
Nowadays the Union runs 4 amateur divisions (fourth to seventh tier in a national level), with 238 clubs participating in them, and a cup competition between the clubs that are members of the Union, and participate either in the Union's championships or in the semi-professional Gamma Ethniki. 238 football clubs participate in the championships organised by the Union itself. 9 clubs of the union participate in the Delta Ethniki championship, 2 in Football League 2, 1 in Football League and 3 in the Greek Superleague. It also holds U-16 and U-18 sides that compete in the respective national interregional championships.

EPSM Championships (1923-1959)

From its foundation to 1959 (the year of the foundation of the nationwide championship of Alpha Ethniki) the Union of Football Clubs of Macedonia organised a league that was considered the top tier of football in Northern Greece, and its winner was proclaimed "EPSM champion".

List of EPSM champions

1923-24: Aris
1924-25: Not held
1925-26: Aris
1926-27: Iraklis
1927-28: Aris
1928-29: Aris
1929-30: Aris
1930-31: Aris
1931-32: Megas Alexandros
1933-34: Aris
1934-35: Not held
1935-36: Not held
1936-37: PAOK
1937-38: Aris
1938-39: Iraklis
1939-40: Iraklis
1940-45: Not held due to World War II
1945-46: Aris
1946-47: Makedonikos
1947-48: PAOK
1948-49: Aris
1949-50: PAOK
1950-51: Iraklis
1951-52: Iraklis
1952-53: Aris
1953-54: PAOK
1954-55: PAOK
1955-56: PAOK
1956-57: PAOK
1957-58: Apollon Kalamarias
1958-59: ArisSource:''

Winners

References

External links
 Official site

Association football governing bodies in Greece
Sport in Thessaloniki